Glycerol, also called glycerine in British English and glycerin in American English, is a simple triol compound. It is a colorless, odorless, viscous liquid that is sweet-tasting and non-toxic. The glycerol backbone is found in lipids known as glycerides. Because it has antimicrobial and antiviral properties, it is widely used in wound and burn treatments approved by the U.S. Food and Drug Administration. Conversely, it is also used as a bacterial culture medium. Its presence in blood can be used as an effective marker to measure liver disease. It is also widely used as a sweetener in the food industry and as a humectant in pharmaceutical formulations. Because of its three hydroxyl groups, glycerol is miscible with water and is hygroscopic in nature.

Structure
Although achiral, glycerol is prochiral with respect to reactions of one of the two primary alcohols. Thus, in substituted derivatives, the stereospecific numbering labels the molecule with a sn- prefix before the stem name of the molecule.

Production
Glycerol is generally obtained from plant and animal sources where it occurs in triglycerides, esters of glycerol with long-chain carboxylic acids. The hydrolysis, saponification, or transesterification of these triglycerides produces glycerol as well as the fatty acid derivative:

Triglycerides can be saponified with sodium hydroxide to give glycerol and fatty sodium salt or soap.

Typical plant sources include soybeans or palm. Animal-derived tallow is another source. Approximately 950,000 tons per year are produced in the United States and Europe; 350,000 tons of glycerol were produced per year in the U.S. alone from 2000 to 2004. The EU directive 2003/30/EC set a requirement that 5.75% of petroleum fuels were to be replaced with biofuel sources across all member states by 2010. It was projected in 2006 that by 2020, production would be six times more than demand, creating an excess of glycerol as a byproduct of biofuel production.

Glycerol from triglycerides is produced on a large scale, but the crude product is of variable quality, with a low selling price of as low as US$0.02–0.05 per kilogram in 2011. It can be purified, but the process is expensive. Some glycerol is burned for energy, but its heat value is low.

Crude glycerol from the hydrolysis of triglycerides can be purified by treatment with activated carbon to remove organic impurities, alkali to remove unreacted glycerol esters, and ion exchange to remove salts. High purity glycerol (greater than 99.5%) is obtained by multi-step distillation; a vacuum chamber is necessary due to its high boiling point (290 °C).

Synthetic glycerol

Although usually not cost-effective, glycerol can be produced by various routes from propene. The epichlorohydrin process is the most important: it involves the chlorination of propylene to give allyl chloride, which is oxidized with hypochlorite to dichlorohydrin, which reacts with a strong base to give epichlorohydrin. Epichlorohydrin can be hydrolyzed to glycerol. Chlorine-free processes from propylene include the synthesis of glycerol from acrolein and propylene oxide.

Because of the large-scale production of biodiesel from fats, where glycerol is a waste product, the market for glycerol is depressed. Thus, synthetic processes are not economical. Owing to oversupply, efforts are being made to convert glycerol to synthetic precursors, such as acrolein and epichlorohydrin.

Applications

Food industry
In food and beverages, glycerol serves as a humectant, solvent, and sweetener, and may help preserve foods. It is also used as filler in commercially prepared low-fat foods (e.g., cookies), and as a thickening agent in liqueurs. Glycerol and water are used to preserve certain types of plant leaves. As a sugar substitute, it has approximately 27 kilocalories per teaspoon (sugar has 20) and is 60% as sweet as sucrose. It does not feed the bacteria that form a dental plaque and cause dental cavities. As a food additive, glycerol is labeled as E number E422. It is added to icing (frosting) to prevent it from setting too hard.

As used in foods, glycerol is categorized by the U.S. Academy of Nutrition and Dietetics as a carbohydrate. The U.S. Food and Drug Administration (FDA) carbohydrate designation includes all caloric macronutrients excluding protein and fat. Glycerol has a caloric density similar to table sugar, but a lower glycemic index and different metabolic pathway within the body.

It is also recommended as an additive when using polyol sweeteners such as erythritol and xylitol which have a cooling effect, due to its heating effect in the mouth, if the cooling effect is not wanted.

Medical, pharmaceutical and personal care applications

Glycerin is mildly antimicrobial and antiviral and is an FDA-approved treatment for wounds. The Red Cross reports that an 85% solution of glycerin shows bactericidal and antiviral effects, and wounds treated with glycerin show reduced inflammation after roughly two hours. Due to this it is used widely in wound care products, including glycerin based hydrogel sheets for burns and other wound care. It is approved for all types of wound care except third-degree burns, and is used to package donor skin used in skin grafts.

Glycerol is used in medical, pharmaceutical and personal care preparations, often as a means of improving smoothness, providing lubrication, and as a humectant.

Ichthyosis and xerosis have been relieved by the topical use of glycerin. It is found in allergen immunotherapies, cough syrups, elixirs and expectorants, toothpaste, mouthwashes, skin care products, shaving cream, hair care products, soaps, and water-based personal lubricants. In solid dosage forms like tablets, glycerol is used as a tablet holding agent. For human consumption, glycerol is classified by the FDA among the sugar alcohols as a caloric macronutrient. Glycerol is also used in blood banking to preserve red blood cells prior to freezing.

Glycerol is a component of glycerin soap. Essential oils are added for fragrance. This kind of soap is used by people with sensitive, easily irritated skin because it prevents skin dryness with its moisturizing properties. It draws moisture up through skin layers and slows or prevents excessive drying and evaporation.

Taken rectally, glycerol functions as a laxative by irritating the anal mucosa and inducing a hyperosmotic effect, expanding the colon by drawing water into it to induce peristalsis resulting in evacuation. It may be administered undiluted either as a suppository or as a small-volume (2–10 ml) enema. Alternatively, it may be administered in a dilute solution, such as 5%, as a high-volume enema.

Taken orally (often mixed with fruit juice to reduce its sweet taste), glycerol can cause a rapid, temporary decrease in the internal pressure of the eye. This can be useful for the initial emergency treatment of severely elevated eye pressure.

In 2017, researchers showed that the probiotic Limosilactobacillus reuteri bacteria can be supplemented with glycerol to enhance its production of antimicrobial substances in the human gut. This was confirmed to be as effective as the antibiotic vancomycin at inhibiting Clostridioides difficile infection without having a significant effect on the overall microbial composition of the gut.

Glycerol has also been incorporated as a component of bio-ink formulations in the field of bioprinting. The glycerol content acts to add viscosity to the bio-ink without adding large protein, saccharide, or glycoprotein molecules.

Botanical extracts
When utilized in "tincture" method extractions, specifically as a 10% solution, glycerol prevents tannins from precipitating in ethanol extracts of plants (tinctures). It is also used as an "alcohol-free" alternative to ethanol as a solvent in preparing herbal extractions. It is less extractive when utilized in a standard tincture methodology. Alcohol-based tinctures can also have the alcohol removed and replaced with glycerol for its preserving properties. Such products are not "alcohol-free" in a scientific or FDA regulatory sense, as glycerol contains three hydroxyl groups. Fluid extract manufacturers often extract herbs in hot water before adding glycerol to make glycerites.

When used as a primary "true" alcohol-free botanical extraction solvent in non-tincture based methodologies, glycerol has been shown to possess a high degree of extractive versatility for botanicals including removal of numerous constituents and complex compounds, with an extractive power that can rival that of alcohol and water–alcohol solutions. That glycerol possesses such high extractive power assumes it is utilized with dynamic (critical) methodologies as opposed to standard passive "tincturing" methodologies that are better suited to alcohol. Glycerol possesses the intrinsic property of not denaturing or rendering a botanical's constituents inert like alcohols (ethanol, methanol, and so on) do. Glycerol is a stable preserving agent for botanical extracts that, when utilized in proper concentrations in an extraction solvent base, does not allow inverting or mitigates reduction-oxidation of a finished extract's constituents, even over several years. Both glycerol and ethanol are viable preserving agents. Glycerol is bacteriostatic in its action, and ethanol is bactericidal in its action.

Electronic cigarette liquid

Glycerin, along with propylene glycol, is a common component of e-liquid, a solution used with electronic vaporizers (electronic cigarettes). This glycerol is heated with an atomizer (a heating coil often made of Kanthal wire), producing the aerosol that delivers nicotine to the user.

Antifreeze

Like ethylene glycol and propylene glycol, glycerol is a non-ionic kosmotrope that forms strong hydrogen bonds with water molecules, competing with water-water hydrogen bonds. This interaction disrupts the formation of ice. The minimum freezing point temperature is about  corresponding to 70% glycerol in water.

Glycerol was historically used as an anti-freeze for automotive applications before being replaced by ethylene glycol, which has a lower freezing point. While the minimum freezing point of a glycerol-water mixture is higher than an ethylene glycol-water mixture, glycerol is not toxic and is being re-examined for use in automotive applications.

In the laboratory, glycerol is a common component of solvents for enzymatic reagents stored at temperatures below  due to the depression of the freezing temperature. It is also used as a cryoprotectant where the glycerol is dissolved in water to reduce damage by ice crystals to laboratory organisms that are stored in frozen solutions, such as fungi, bacteria, nematodes, and mammalian embryos. Some organisms like the moor frog produce glycerol to survive freezing temperatures during hibernation.

Chemical intermediate
Glycerol is used to produce nitroglycerin, which is an essential ingredient of various explosives such as dynamite, gelignite, and propellants like cordite. Reliance on soap-making to supply co-product glycerol made it difficult to increase production to meet wartime demand. Hence, synthetic glycerol processes were national defense priorities in the days leading up to World War II. Nitroglycerin, also known as glyceryl trinitrate (GTN) is commonly used to relieve angina pectoris, taken in the form of sub-lingual tablets, patches, or as an aerosol spray.

Trifunctional polyether polyols are produced from glycerol and propylene oxide.  An oxidation of glycerol affords mesoxalic acid. Dehydrating glycerol affords hydroxyacetone.

Vibration damping
Glycerol is used as fill for pressure gauges to damp vibration. External vibrations, from compressors, engines, pumps, etc., produce harmonic vibrations within Bourdon gauges that can cause the needle to move excessively, giving inaccurate readings. The excessive swinging of the needle can also damage internal gears or other components, causing premature wear. Glycerol, when poured into a gauge to replace the air space, reduces the harmonic vibrations that are transmitted to the needle, increasing the lifetime and reliability of the gauge.

Niche uses

Entertainment industry
Glycerol is used by set decorators when filming scenes involving water to prevent an area meant to look wet from drying out too quickly.

Glycerine is also used in the generation of theatrical smoke and fog as a component of the fluid used in fog machines as a replacement for glycol, which has been shown to be an irritant if exposure is prolonged.

Ultrasonic couplant
Glycerol can be sometimes used as replacement for water in ultrasonic testing, as it has favourably higher acoustic impedance (2.42 MRayl versus 1.483 MRayl for water) while being relatively safe, non-toxic, non-corrosive and relatively low cost.

Internal combustion fuel
Glycerol is also used to power diesel generators supplying electricity for the FIA Formula E series of electric race cars.

Research on uses
Research has been conducted to produce value-added products from glycerol obtained from biodiesel production. Examples (aside from combustion of waste glycerol):
 Hydrogen gas production
 Glycerine acetate is a potential fuel additive.
 Glycerol is one of the most used additive for starch thermoplastic.
 Conversion to propylene glycol
 Conversion to acrolein
 Conversion to ethanol
 Conversion to epichlorohydrin, a raw material for epoxy resins

Metabolism
Glycerol is a precursor for synthesis of triacylglycerols and of phospholipids in the liver and adipose tissue. When the body uses stored fat as a source of energy, glycerol and fatty acids are released into the bloodstream.

Glycerol is mainly metabolized in the liver. Glycerol injections can be used as a simple test for liver damage, as its rate of absorption by the liver is considered an accurate measure of liver health. Glycerol metabolism is reduced in both cirrhosis and fatty liver disease.

Blood glycerol levels are highly elevated during diabetes, and is believed to be the cause of reduced fertility in patients who suffer from diabetes and metabolic syndrome. Blood glycerol levels in diabetic patients average three times higher than healthy controls. Direct glycerol treatment of testes has been found to cause significant long-term reduction in sperm count. Further testing on this subject was abandoned due to the unexpected results, as this was not the goal of the experiment.

Circulating glycerol does not glycate proteins as do glucose or fructose, and does not lead to the formation of advanced glycation endproducts (AGEs). In some organisms, the glycerol component can enter the glycolysis pathway directly and, thus, provide energy for cellular metabolism (or, potentially, be converted to glucose through gluconeogenesis).

Before glycerol can enter the pathway of glycolysis or gluconeogenesis (depending on physiological conditions), it must be converted to their intermediate glyceraldehyde 3-phosphate in the following steps:

The enzyme glycerol kinase is present mainly in the liver and kidneys, but also in other body tissues, including muscle and brain. In adipose tissue, glycerol 3-phosphate is obtained from dihydroxyacetone phosphate with the enzyme glycerol-3-phosphate dehydrogenase.

Glycerol has very low toxicity when ingested; its LD50 oral dose for rats is 12600 mg/kg and 8700 mg/kg for mice. It does not appear to cause toxicity when inhaled, although changes in cell maturity occurred in small sections of lung in animals under the highest dose measured. A sub-chronic 90-day nose-only inhalation study in Sprague–Dawley (SD) rats exposed to 0.03, 0.16 and 0.66 mg/L glycerin (Per liter of air) for 6-hour continuous sessions revealed no treatment-related toxicity other than minimal metaplasia of the epithelium lining at the base of the epiglottis in rats exposed to 0.66 mg/L glycerin.

Historical cases of contamination with diethylene glycol
On 4 May 2007, the FDA advised all U.S. makers of medicines to test all batches of glycerol for diethylene glycol contamination. This followed an occurrence of hundreds of fatal poisonings in Panama resulting from a falsified import customs declaration by Panamanian import/export firm Aduanas Javier de Gracia Express, S. A. The cheaper diethylene glycol was relabeled as the more expensive glycerol. Between 1990 and 1998, incidents of DEG poisoning reportedly occurred in Argentina, Bangladesh, India, and Nigeria, and resulted in hundreds of deaths. In 1937, more than one hundred people died in the United States after ingesting DEG-contaminated elixir sulfanilamide, a drug used to treat infections.

Etymology
The origin of the gly- and glu- prefixes for glycols and sugars is from Ancient Greek  glukus which means sweet.

Properties
Table of thermal and physical properties of saturated liquid glycerin:
{|class="wikitable mw-collapsible mw-collapsed"
!Temperature (°C)
!Density (kg/m3)
!Specific heat (kJ/kg·K)
!Kinematic viscosity (m2/s)
!Conductivity (W/m·K)
!Thermal diffusivity (m2/s)
!Prandtl number
!Bulk modulus (K−1)
|-
|0
|1276.03
|2.261
|
|0.282
|
|84700
|
|-
|10
|1270.11
|2.319
|
|0.284
|
|31000
|
|-
|20
|1264.02
|2.386
|
|0.286
|
|12500
|
|-
|30
|1258.09
|2.445
|
|0.286
|
|5380
|
|-
|40
|1252.01
|2.512
|
|0.286
|
|2450
|
|-
|50
|1244.96
|2.583
|
|0.287
|
|1630
|
|}

See also
 Dioxalin
 Epichlorohydrin
 Nitroglycerin
 Oleochemicals
 Saponification/Soapmaking
 Solketal
 Transesterification

References

External links
 Mass spectrum of glycerol 
 CDC – NIOSH Pocket Guide to Chemical Hazards – Glycerin (mist)

Alcohol solvents
Biofuels
Commodity chemicals
Cosmetics chemicals
Demulcents
E-number additives
Food additives
Glassforming liquids and melts
 
Household chemicals
Laxatives
Sugar alcohols
Triols
By-products